The Virtuous Husband is a 1931 American pre-Code comedy film directed by Vin Moore and written by Jerry Horwin, Edward Ludwig, Fred Niblo, Jr. and Dale Van Every. The film stars Betty Compson, Elliott Nugent, Jean Arthur, J. C. Nugent, Alison Skipworth and Tully Marshall. The film was released on April 12, 1931 by Universal Pictures.

Premise
A man marries at a young age and bases all of his marriage decisions on advice written in letters from his dead mother. The wife can't stand it and eventually burns them, and the man grows more tolerable.

Cast 
Elliott Nugent as Daniel Curtis
Betty Compson as Inez Wakefield
Jean Arthur as Barbara Olwell
Tully Marshall as Ezra Hunniwell
J. C. Nugent as Mr. Olwell
Alison Skipworth as Mrs. Olwell
Eva McKenzie as Hester
Willie Best as Luftus

References

External links
 
 

1931 films
American comedy films
1931 comedy films
Universal Pictures films
Films directed by Vin Moore
American black-and-white films
1930s English-language films
1930s American films